Gwen Lux Creighton professionally Gwen Lux, (1908–2001) was an American sculptor known for her abstraction and frequently constructed from polyester resin concrete and metals. She was among America’s pioneer women sculptors.

Biography
Gwen Wickerts was born in Chicago, Illinois on November 17, 1908. She began her art studies in Detroit at age 14, taking classes with potter, Mary Chase Perry Stratton at Pewabic Pottery. She later studied at Wicker School of Fine Art and Art League of Detroit between 1923–1926. Followed by a year of study at Maryland Institute College of Art (MICA) from 1926 until 1927, and at the School of the Museum of Fine Arts, Boston from 1927 until 1928. In 1933, she received a Guggenheim Fellowship for Fine Art.

Lux lived and worked in Detroit, Michigan in the early part of her career, and then moved to Honolulu, Hawaii in 1973. 
 
Her first marriage was to fellow sculptor Eugene "Gene" J. Lux, which ended in divorce. In 1959, she married Thomas Hawk Creighton, a longtime editor of Progressive Architecture magazine. Thomas Hawk Creighton died in 1984 in Hawaii. In 1986, Lux married, to her longtime friend and companion Jerome R. Wallace, a well-known artist who created batiks using natural dyes found in the local environment on the island of Kauai, Hawaii.

Notable commissions
Her commissions included sculptures for Radio City Music Hall in New York City, the McGraw-Hill Building in Chicago, the General Motors Technical Center in Detroit, and the centerpiece for the first class dining room of the SS United States  The Detroit Institute of Arts, the Hawaii State Art Museum, the Kresge Art Museum (Michigan State University, East Lansing) and the Mariners' Museum (Newport News, Virginia) are among the public collections holding her work.

Her sculptures combined abstraction and realism, and were frequently constructed from polyester resin concrete and metals. She taught sculpture classes at the Arts & Crafts Society of Detroit.

Further reading
 Collins, Jim L. Women Artists in America II, Chattanooga, Tenn., Collins, 1975.
 Heller, Jules and Nancy G. Heller, North American Women Artists of the Twentieth Century: A Biographical Dictionary, New York, Garland, 1995.
 Roussel, Christine, The Guide to the Art of Rockefeller Center, New York, W.W. Norton, 2006.
 Rubinstein, Charlotte Streifer, American Women Sculptors: A History of Women Working in Three Dimensions, Boston, G.K. Hall, 1990.

References

External links 

 Image of Gwen Lux, from ca.1940, from the Archives of American Art, Smithsonian Institution

1908 births
2001 deaths
American women sculptors
Artists from Hawaii
Modern sculptors
20th-century American sculptors
20th-century American women artists
Maryland Institute College of Art alumni
School of the Museum of Fine Arts at Tufts alumni